Craig Watson (born 7 February 1983) is a British former professional boxer who competed from 2005 to 2013. He held the Commonwealth welterweight title from 2007 to 2009; the Commonwealth super welterweight title in 2010; and the British welterweight title in 2011.

Amateur boxing career
Watson first gained TV exposure after taking on Amir Khan. Going into the bout as an unknown he was heavily written off by many as Khan was the Olympic silver medalist at the time however Watson managed to score a knock down and only lost on a close points defeat.

Professional boxing career

Early professional career
Watson had his first professional contest in May 2005 when he scored a 2nd round tko over Willie Valentine at the Elephant and Castle Centre in Southwark.  He won his next six fights in a row before stepping up to fight fellow prospect John Fewkes (13–0) at the Leeds Town Hall.  The fight gave Watson his first pro defeat as Fewkes scored a points victory over 8 rounds.  Following that first loss Watson regrouped and scored wins over Robert Lloyd-Taylor (twice) and fellow prospect Michael Lomax.  The victories set him up for a shot at the Commonwealth Welterweight title held by tough Namibian Ali Nuumbembe in a fight to be held on 8 December 2007 at the Robin Park Centre in Wigan.

Commonwealth welterweight champion
Watson produced the performance of his career so far in Wigan, beating Nuumbembe to win the Commonwealth title when the fight was stopped in the 8th round.  An early clash of heads had caused a cut above Nuumbembe's left eye which eventually got so bad that the corner could not stem the flow of blood and so handed Watson victory. The newly crowned champion then travelled to Italy for his next fight to contest the vacant European Union belt against unbeaten Italian Daniele Petrucci.  The fight on 8 March 2008 ended in bitter disappointment for Watson when the referee stopped it in the 3rd round with Watson saying that he was neither "mentally or physically prepared" for the fight having taken the match at short notice.

Redemption came only a few months later on 24 May 2008 when Watson found himself sharing a ring with Matthew Hatton at the City of Manchester Stadium.  The fight for Watson's Commonwealth title was on the undercard to Ricky Hatton's fight with Juan Lazcano in what was widely dubbed as the Hitman's homecoming following his defeat to Floyd Mayweather in Las Vegas.  Watson ended up winning the fight on points over 12 rounds prompting Hatton to say afterwards that Watson was the first man who had legitimately beaten him in the ring. On 11 April 2009 Watson lost the title in his second defence to John O'Donnell in a close fought contest at the York Hall to register the third defeat of his career.  The contest shown live on ITV4 was described as scintillating as well as a 'classic bout' by observers sitting ringside.

Commonwealth light middleweight champion
Watson rebounded from the defeat to O'Donnell with a points win over journeyman Matt Scriven 21 August 2009 and a second round stoppage of Swiss boxer Riad Menasria on 27 November 2009.  Prior to the fight with Menasria, Watson had said that he was looking to compete at light welterweight in the future and wanted to meet reigning British champion Lenny Daws. On 19 February 2010 in his first fight of the new year, Watson travelled to Stoke and stopped former British title challenger |Barrie Jones in 4 rounds. His chance to regain a championship belt came just over one full year since his defeat to O'Donnell.  Given just two days notice Watson stepped in to fight Ugandan boxer Badru Lusambya on 16 April 2010 for the light middleweight version of the Commonwealth belt.  Despite having never fought at the higher weight before, Watson put his opponent down 4 times in the second round to win a convincing victory. Despite the victory and the title Watson chose to move back down to welterweight for his next contest on 16 July 2010 after deciding that light middleweight was perhaps not his ideal weight.  His opponent, the Ghanain journeyman Stephen Okine was stopped in the fifth round on the undercard of a bill that saw former victim Matthew Hatton retain his European title with a victory over his mandatory challenger Yuriy Nuzhnenko. On 6 November 2010 Watson moved back up to light middleweight at the Castle Leisure Center in Bury to register a win against Romanian journeyman Vasile Surcica, putting him down in the 8th round but failing to stop him inside the distance and scoring an 8 round points win.

British welterweight champion
Watson won the British title on 19 February 2011 with a revenge win against John O'Donnell, the man he had previously lost his old Commonwealth title to.  Prior to the fight Watson referred to some of the pre-fight talk between the two fighters saying "He says he will shut me up, but it's all right saying that ... we'll see what happens in the ring". Watson said that following the close nature of the result against O'Donnell last time he had been consumed by bitterness and said that he was the victim of a home town decision as the fight took place in London, O'Donnells home. This time however there was to be no mistake.  The return against O'Donnell once again took place in London, this time at the Wembley Arena, but the judges scored 116–113, 116–112 and 117–112 all to Watson over the 12 rounds. On 16 April 2011, in his first defence of the title, Watson lost to Lee Purdy.  The fight, on the undercard of Amir Khan's contest with Paul McCloskey was stopped in the fifth round when Purdy caught Watson with a right hand to the jaw to win the British title. Watson attempted to retain the title on 16 July 2011 with a bout in his home town of Oldham but was once again stopped in the fifth as Purdy made a successful first defence.

Professional Boxing record

| style="text-align:center;" colspan="8"|22 Wins (9 knockouts, 13 decisions),  5 Losses, 0 Draws
|-
|align=center style="border-style: none none solid solid; background: #e3e3e3"|Res.
|align=center style="border-style: none none solid solid; background: #e3e3e3"|Record
|align=center style="border-style: none none solid solid; background: #e3e3e3"|Opponent
|align=center style="border-style: none none solid solid; background: #e3e3e3"|Type
|align=center style="border-style: none none solid solid; background: #e3e3e3"|Rd., Time
|align=center style="border-style: none none solid solid; background: #e3e3e3"|Date
|align=center style="border-style: none none solid solid; background: #e3e3e3"|Location
|align=center style="border-style: none none solid solid; background: #e3e3e3"|Notes
|-align=center
|Win
|22–5
|align=left| Mark Lloyd
|RTD
|4 
|2013-03-08	
|align=left| Bowlers Exhibition Centre, Manchester, England
|align=left|
|-align=center
|Win
|21–5
|align=left| Tomasz Mazurkiewicz
|PTS
|6
|2012-06-16	
|align=left| Velodrome, Manchester, England
|align=left|
|-align=center
|Loss
|20–5
|align=left| Lee Purdy
|TKO
|5 
|2011-07-16	
|align=left| Oldham Sports Centre, Manchester, England
|align=left|
|-align=center
|Loss
|20–4
|align=left| Lee Purdy
|TKO
|5 
|2011-04-16	
|align=left| M.E.N. Arena, Manchester, England
|align=left|
|-align=center
|Win
|20–3
|align=left| John O'Donnell
|UD
|12 
|2011-02-19	
|align=left| Wembley Arena, Wembley, London, England
|align=left|
|-align=center
|Win
|19–3
|align=left| Vasile Surcica
|PTS
|8 
|2010-11-06	
|align=left| Castle Leisure Centre, Bury, Greater Manchester, England
|align=left|
|-align=center
|Win
|18–3
|align=left| Stephen Okine
|TKO
|5 
|2010-07-16	
|align=left| Bolton Arena, Bolton, Greater Manchester, England
|align=left| 
|-align=center
|Win
|17–3
|align=left| Badru Lusambya
|TKO
|2 
|2010-04-16	
|align=left| Robin Park Centre, Wigan, Greater Manchester, England
|align=left|
|-align=center
|Win
|16–3
|align=left| Barrie Jones
|TKO
|4 
|2010-02-19	
|align=left| Fenton Manor Sports Complex, Stoke, Staffordshire, England
|align=left|
|-align=center
|Win
|15–3
|align=left| Riad Menasria
|TKO
|2 
|2009-11-27
|align=left| Robin Park Centre, Wigan, Greater Manchester, England
|align=left|
|-align=center
|Win
|14–3
|align=left| Matt Scriven
|PTS
|6 
|2009-08-21
|align=left| Velodrome, Manchester, England
|align=left|
|-align=center
|Lose
|13–3
|align=left| John O'Donnell
|SD
|12 
|2009-04-11
|align=left| York Hall, Bethnal Green, London, England
|align=left|
|-align=center
|Win
|13–2
|align=left| Matthew Hatton
|UD
|12 
|2008-05-24
|align=left| City of Manchester Stadium, Manchester, England
|align=left|
|-align=center
|Loss
|12–2
|align=left| Daniele Petrucci
|TKO
|3 
|2008-03-08
|align=left| Tendastrisce, Rome, Italy
|align=left|
|-align=center
|Win
|12–1
|align=left| Paulus Ali Nuumbembe
|TKO
|8 
|2007-12-08
|align=left| Robin Park Centre, Wigan, Greater Manchester, England
|align=left|
|-align=center
|Win
|11–1
|align=left| Frederic Gosset
|PTS
|6
|2007-10-26
|align=left| Robin Park Centre, Wigan, Greater Manchester, England
|align=left|
|-align=center
|Win
|10–1
|align=left| Robert Lloyd-Taylor
|TKO
|1 
|2007-09-21
|align=left| York Hall, Bethnal Green, London, England
|align=left|
|-align=center
|Win
|9–1
|align=left| Michael Lomax
|PTS
|8
|2007-07-06
|align=left| Robin Park Centre, Wigan, Greater Manchester, England
|align=left|
|-align=center
|Win
|8–1
|align=left| Robert Lloyd-Taylor
|PTS
|8
|2007-04-27
|align=left| Wembley Arena, Wembley, London, England
|align=left|
|-align=center
|Loss
|7–1
|align=left| John Fewkes
|PTS
|8
|2007-02-09
|align=left| Town Hall, Leeds, Yorkshire, England
|align=left|
|-align=center
|Win
|7–0
|align=left| Rakhim Mingaleyev
|PTS
|6
|2006-11-25
|align=left| Holiday Inn, Belfast, Northern Ireland
|align=left|
|-align=center
|Win
|6–0
|align=left| Michael Medor
|TKO
|1 
|2006-09-29
|align=left| George Carnall Leisure Centre, Davyhulme, England
|align=left|
|-align=center
|Win
|5–0
|align=left| Serhiy Tertyy
|PTS
|6
|2005-11-04
|align=left| York Hall, Bethnal Green, London, England
|align=left|
|-align=center
|Win
|4–0
|align=left| Ben Hudson
|PTS
|4
|2005-10-07
|align=left| York Hall, Bethnal Green, London, England
|align=left|
|-align=center
|Win
|3–0
|align=left| Billy Smith
|PTS
|4
|2005-07-16
|align=left| Bolton Arena, Bolton, Greater Manchester, England
|align=left|
|-align=center
|Win
|2–0
|align=left| Jus Wallie
|PTS
|4
|2005-06-19
|align=left| York Hall, Bethnal Green, London, England
|align=left|
|-align=center
|Win
|1–0
|align=left| Willie Valentine
|RTD
|2 
|2005-06-19
|align=left| Elephant & Castle Centre , Southwark, London, England
|align=left|
|-align=center

References

 
 
 
 

English male boxers
Welterweight boxers
Sportspeople from Oldham
1983 births
Living people